The 1937-38 Svenksa Serien season was the third season of the Svenska Serien, the top level ice hockey league in Sweden. AIK won the league for the third year in a row.

Final standings

External links
1937-38 season

Swe
1937–38 in Swedish ice hockey
Svenska Serien (ice hockey) seasons